Morton Peto Betts (30 August 1847 – 19 April 1914) was a leading English sportsman of the late 19th century. He was notable for scoring the first goal in an English FA Cup Final.

Early life
Betts was the son of Edward Betts of Preston Hall, Aylesford, a civil engineering contractor, and Ann Betts, née Peto. Edward was in business Ann's brother, the railway entrepreneur Samuel Morton Peto, the pair operating as Peto and Betts until the firm was declared bankrupt in 1866. Morton was educated at Harrow School.

Sporting life
Betts was an amateur association footballer and cricketer. His most notable moment came when he scored the only goal in the 1872 FA Cup Final for Wanderers, the first final of the tournament. The goal was a relatively simple 'tap-in', coming as a result of Walpole Vidal's successful dribble through the Royal Engineers' defence. In the match, he played under the pseudonym AH Chequer; Betts played for Harrow Chequers, a team associated with the school, who had been drawn to played Royal Engineers in the first round of the tournament but failed to fulfil the fixture.

Betts usually played football as a full-back, though his one appearance for England national team – against Scotland in 1877 – was as a goalkeeper. By this time, he was with the Old Harrovians Football Club. He later became a referee, helped found the Kent Football Association and was a board member of the Football Association for 20 years.

His sporting career also featured first-class cricket appearances for Middlesex (one match) and Kent County Cricket Clubs (two matches). He played club cricket for a variety of sides, including Harrow Wanderers, Incogniti and Band of Brothers, a side closely associated with the Kent county club, as well as for Essex County Cricket Club in 1884, before they became a first-class county. He was secretary of Essex between 1887 and 1890 before resigning to take up the post of secretary of the newly formed British Baseball Association and as a Director of Preston North End Baseball Club in the 1890 National League of Baseball of Great Britain.

Later life
He married twice, first to Jane Bouch in 1879 and then to Jane Morgan in 1901. He spent his final years living in France, and died aged 66 at Menton, shortly before the outbreak of World War I.

References

Giller, Norman; 2004; 'Football and all That'; Hodder and Stoughton; pp15–16;

External links

1847 births
1914 deaths
Association football forwards
Association football fullbacks
Association football goalkeepers
England international footballers
England v Scotland representative footballers (1870–1872)
English cricket administrators
English cricketers
English footballers
Essex cricketers
FA Cup Final players
Harrow Chequers F.C. players
Kent cricketers
Middlesex cricketers
Old Harrovians F.C. players
Outfield association footballers who played in goal
People educated at Harrow School
Wanderers F.C. players
19th-century British businesspeople
Baseball in the United Kingdom